Swan Pond is an unincorporated community in Berkeley County, West Virginia, United States. It takes its name from the Swan Pond reservoir there.

Unincorporated communities in Berkeley County, West Virginia
Unincorporated communities in West Virginia